Joseph George Minish (September 1, 1916 – November 24, 2007) was an American Democratic Party politician from New Jersey who represented  in the United States House of Representatives.

Early life

Born in Throop, Pennsylvania, Minish was the son of a coal miner, George Joseph Minish (1894-1932).  His grandfather, Vincenzo "James" Minisci (1860-1920), emigrated to the United States from Italy in 1886.  His mother, Angeline Nardozzi Minish (1898-1954), emigrated to the United States from Italy as an infant. Minish had two brothers: James Minish (1920-1928) and Francis X. Minish (1926-2009); and three sisters: Pauline Minish LaBelle (1918-2001); Mary Minish Mecca (1921-2000); and Lena Minish Mecca (1923-1994).  His brothers-in-law, Charles and James Mecca, were brothers.

He graduated Dunmore High School in 1935, and served in the United States Army from 1945 to 1946.

Labor Leader

Minish spent his early career in organized labor.  He was the executive secretary of the Essex-West Hudson Council, Congress of Industrial Organizations, from 1954 to 1960, and the executive director of the Essex-West Industrial Union Council, AFL-CIO, from 1960 to 1962.

Political career

In 1962, seven-term Democratic U.S. Rep. Hugh Joseph Addonizio gave up his Essex County, New Jersey-based House seat to run for Mayor of Newark.  Essex County Democratic leaders picked the 46-year-old Minish to defend the seat, which was considered to be politically competitive, especially in the mid-term election of President John F. Kennedy. The district included tenements and low-cost housing in Newark, New Jersey, as well as wealthy suburbs like South Orange and West Orange.  He was unopposed in the Democratic primary.  In the general election, he faced Republican Frank A. Palmieri, a lawyer who had won 36% of the vote against Addonizio in 1960.  Labor leaders rallied behind Minish, who as a first-time candidate pledged to support the Kennedy Administration.  His campaign platform included advocacy of "Federal aid for education for construction and teacher salaries; extension of the Social Security Act to provide medical care for the aged; 'long-term loans and technical assistance to emerging nations; and the establishment of a cabinet-level Department of Urban Affairs." Minish won by a large margin, 48,102 (59.45%) to 30,244 (37.28%) for Palmieri.

Minish spent 22 years in the U.S. House of Representatives, winning re-election easily. In 1964, he beat William L. Stubbs, who had been the first African American to win a major party nomination for Congress in New Jersey.  He beat: attorney Leonard Felzenberg in 1966; George M. Wallhauser, Jr., the son of a former Republican congressman, in 1968; businessman James Shue, the father of actors Elisabeth Shue and Andrew Shue. in 1970; and in his first seriously contested re-election bid, former State Senator Milton Waldor in 1972.  Later, easily defeated attorney William Grant in 1974; former Essex County Young Republican Chairman Charles Poekel in 1976; businessman Julius George Feld in 1978; conservative activist Bob Davis in 1980; and businessman Rowley (Rey) Reddington in 1982.

As a Congressman, Minish served on the House Banking, Finance and Urban Affairs Committee, and was the Chairman of the Subcommittee on General Oversight.  The Newark Star-Ledger, which covered Minish's entire political career, said that he was a staunch party loyalist and supporter of organized labor who ran a strong constituent service operation but had no real impact on legislation.  Minish was a somewhat conservative Democrat by New Jersey standards.  He drew poor ratings from civil liberties groups, supported the Vietnam War, and opposed campaign finance reform and legalized abortion. Minish was described as a low-key Democrat with few accomplishments.

During his two decades in the House, Minish was a supporter of big financial institutions and received considerable campaign contributions from the banking industry.  He won some headlines for criticizing profiteering by defense contractors and accusing natural gas producers of price gauging.

In early 1984, a court-ordered redrawing of New Jersey's congressional districts radically altered Minish's district.  Most of the Democratic-leaning areas were cut out, replaced with heavily Republican areas to the west—most notably, most of Morris County, one of the most Republican counties in the state. Minish joked that the new map pushed his district so far to the west that he might as well be a congressman from Pennsylvania.  Although Minish now found himself in one of the most Republican districts in the Northeast, he opted to run for reelection in the reconfigured 11th.  He lost, 133,662 (56%) to 106,038 (44%) to State Assembly Minority Leader and Morris County resident Dean Gallo.  Minish blamed his loss on redistricting that made his district so heavily Republican that "I'm not sure the good Lord could have survived."  He also blamed special interest groups who had long lobbied against him.  "If you measure a man by his enemies, I'm pleased to have these guys as my enemies. They're no good for the country. They're greedy," Minish said in a New York Times post-election interview. Proving just how Republican this district now was, a Democrat would not cross the 40 percent mark again for 34 years, until Mikie Sherrill reclaimed the seat for the Democrats in 2018.

Later life

Minish was a longtime resident of West Orange, New Jersey.  His wife, Thesesa V. LaCapra (15 June 1920 - 24 January 1997), was the daughter of Luigi (Louis) LaCapra (1883-1931) and Lucy Vaccaro LaCapra (1898-1938), who were both immigrants from Italy.  His son, George Joseph Minish (1944-1999), sought the Democratic nomination for the New Jersey State Assembly in 1973.  He was not backed by the Essex County Democratic Party leadership and was defeated in the primary by Richard Codey and Eldridge Hawkins.  Another son, James Minish, serves as Executive Vice President of Facilities at New Jersey Sports and Exposition Authority.  A grandson, Joseph Minish, was hired as an Assistant U.S. Attorney for the District of New Jersey in 2004 by U.S. Attorney Chris Christie.

The Joseph G. Minish Passaic River Waterfront and Historic Area in Newark was dedicated in 2008.

By executive order of Governor of New Jersey Jon Corzine, United States and New Jersey flags were flown at half-staff at all state departments, offices and agencies on December 5, 2007, "to honor the memory and the passing of Representative Minish".

References

External links

 

1916 births
2007 deaths
Democratic Party members of the United States House of Representatives from New Jersey
People from West Orange, New Jersey
United States Army soldiers
20th-century American politicians